Mayfield is a suburb to the north of Blenheim's central district, in the Marlborough region of the South Island of New Zealand. Pollard Park and Lansdowne Park are large parks to the west and north of the suburb, and a racecourse lies to the northwest.

Demographics

Mayfield had a population of 1,674 at the 2018 New Zealand census, an increase of 135 people (8.8%) since the 2013 census, and an increase of 204 people (13.9%) since the 2006 census. There were 660 households. There were 852 males and 822 females, giving a sex ratio of 1.04 males per female. The median age was 38.2 years (compared with 37.4 years nationally), with 324 people (19.4%) aged under 15 years, 303 (18.1%) aged 15 to 29, 768 (45.9%) aged 30 to 64, and 279 (16.7%) aged 65 or older.

Ethnicities were 77.1% European/Pākehā, 20.3% Māori, 3.9% Pacific peoples, 10.4% Asian, and 2.5% other ethnicities (totals add to more than 100% since people could identify with multiple ethnicities).

The proportion of people born overseas was 19.4%, compared with 27.1% nationally.

Although some people objected to giving their religion, 52.0% had no religion, 31.4% were Christian, 2.2% were Hindu, 0.2% were Muslim, 0.9% were Buddhist and 4.3% had other religions.

Of those at least 15 years old, 144 (10.7%) people had a bachelor or higher degree, and 348 (25.8%) people had no formal qualifications. The median income was $29,400, compared with $31,800 nationally. The employment status of those at least 15 was that 696 (51.6%) people were employed full-time, 222 (16.4%) were part-time, and 54 (4.0%) were unemployed.

Education
Mayfield School is a coeducational contributing primary (years 1–6) school with a roll of  students as of

References

Suburbs of Blenheim, New Zealand
Populated places in the Marlborough Region